The 2016–17 season was the 77th season of Wisła Kraków in the Ekstraklasa.

Season review

Sponsors

Transfers

Summer transfer window

Arrivals 
 The following players moved to Wisła.

Departures
 The following players moved from Wisła.

Winter transfer window

Arrivals

Departures
 The following players moved from Wisła.

Competitions

Friendlies

Wisła as Kraków Team

Ekstraklasa

Results summary

Regular season

Championship round

Results by round

Regular season

Championship Round

Regular season

Championship Round

Polish Cup

Squad and statistics

Appearances and goals

|-
|}

Goalscorers

Assists

Disciplinary Record

References

Wisła Kraków seasons
Wisla Krakow